Li Jinfang (born October 1963 in Tianlin County, Guangxi) is a Chinese linguist at Minzu University in Beijing, China. Li, an ethnic Zhuang, is a leading specialist in the Kra-Dai languages of southern China, especially the Kra (Geyang) branch. Li's doctoral dissertation focused on the Buyang language, and was published as Studies on the Buyang Language (Bùyāng Yǔ Yánjiū) in 1999.

Publications
Li's Studies on endangered languages in the Southwest China (Xīnán Dìqū Bīnwēi Yǔyán Diàochá Yánjiū) describes the following languages.
Buyang
En
Gelao of Judu, Yueliangwan, Bigong, Dagouchang
Pubiao (Qabiao)
Chadong
Hu
Bugan
Lai (Bolyu)

References

Li Jinfang [李锦芳]. 2006. Studies on endangered languages in the Southwest China [西南地区濒危语言调查研究]. Beijing: Minzu University.
Li Jinfang. 1999. Studies on the Buyang Language [布央语研究]. Beijing: Central University for Nationalities Press.
https://web.archive.org/web/20120323155543/http://www.panjizhai.com/html/2010/0808/317852.php
http://hi.baidu.com/%B6%AB%CE%F7%B6%AB%CE%F7/blog/item/87dc930e13f704ed37d1226d.html

Linguists from China
Linguists of Southeast Asian languages
Linguists of Kra languages
Minzu University of China alumni
Living people
Educators from Guangxi
People from Baise
Academic staff of Minzu University of China
Writers from Guangxi
Scientists from Guangxi
1963 births
Zhuang people
Linguists of Austroasiatic languages
Women linguists